Shyamambaram is an Indian Malayalam language soap opera which premiered on 6 February 2023 on Zee Keralam and streams on the digital platform ZEE5. It stars Haritha G Nair and Rahul Ramachandran. It is an official remake of a Zee Bangla series Krishnakoli.

Plot
Shyama, a skilled singer, faces challenges because of her dark complexion. Later, she marries Akhil, a wealthy man, who helps her conquer her self-consciousness and achieve success.

Cast
Lead cast
 Haritha G Nair as Shyama Vasudevan
 Rahul Ramachandran as Akhil Varma 
 Supporting cast
 R. Pradeep as Vasudevan
 Sindhu Varma as Devaki Vasudevan
Reshmi Boban as vasundhara
 Sajana Chandran as Ananda Varma
 Ann Mathews as Aishwarya 
 Anand Narayanan as Arun Varma 
 Adithyan Jayan as Adithya Varma 
 Maneesha Jaisingh as Amrutha
 Subhash Nair as Jagannathan
 Lekshmi Prasad as Maya
 as Aravindan 
 Resh Lakshna as Nakshatra 
 Master Rahan nowfal as Appu 
 Devi menon as Lakshmi Appachi 
 Ashwathy U Pillai as Jayanthi 
 Shilpa sivadas as Vismaya
 Rhea George as Arundhati 
  Tharakan as Madhavan
 Cameo appearance 
 Kozhikode sarada as Vayttatti 
 Sona Jelina 
 Noobin Johny as Shyama's groom ( episode 1)
Lal Krish as Vishnu

Adaptations

Songs
 Enthe kannanu karuppuniram
 Hey Krishna muralidhara ( orginal title song in promo)
 Manju peyyana
 Kannan aayal Radha venam

References

 

 
Malayalam-language television shows
2023 Indian television series debuts
Zee Keralam original programming